The 2023 Challenger de Tigre II was a professional tennis tournament played on clay courts. It was the fourth edition of the tournament which was part of the 2023 ATP Challenger Tour. It took place in Tigre, Argentina between 9 and 15 January 2023.

Singles main-draw entrants

Seeds

 1 Rankings are as of 2 January 2023.

Other entrants
The following players received wildcards into the singles main draw:
  Valerio Aboian
  Tomás Farjat
  Camilo Ugo Carabelli

The following players received entry into the singles main draw as alternates:
  Rémy Bertola
  Moez Echargui

The following players received entry from the qualifying draw:
  Jurgen Briand
  Matías Franco Descotte
  Edoardo Lavagno
  Oleg Prihodko
  Carlos Sánchez Jover
  Thiago Seyboth Wild

Champions

Singles

  Juan Manuel Cerúndolo def.  Jesper de Jong 6–3, 2–6, 6–2.

Doubles

  Daniel Dutra da Silva /  Oleg Prihodko def.  Chung Yun-seong /  Christian Langmo 6–2, 6–2.

References

2023 ATP Challenger Tour
2023 in Argentine tennis
January 2023 sports events in Argentina